Darius J. Brown is an American politician and member of the Democratic Party. A former Wilmington city councilmember, he was elected to the Delaware Senate in 2018, representing district 2.

Career
Between June 2010 and January 2011, Brown was a constituent relations specialist for Connections, a nonprofit state contractor. From 2011 to 2016, Brown worked as an independent contract lobbyist for Connections and other companies. He became vice president of constituent relations for Connections in November 2016.

In 2012, Brown was elected to the Wilmington City Council to represent the 3rd district. He unsuccessful ran for city treasurer in 2016.

Brown was elected to the Delaware Senate in 2018 after winning 2,115 votes (38.4%) in a four-way primary with no opponent in the general election. He is the second African-American man to be elected to the Delaware Senate. He was appointed chair of the Senate Judiciary Committee, and The News Journal described him as one of the "champions of criminal justice reform" for his actions while chair. He was removed as chair following his May 2021 arrest for domestic violence accusations. In 2021, Brown was hired as Executive Director of the Wilmington HOPE Commission, a not-for-profit organization which aims to lower recidivism by helping ex-offenders re-enter society after leaving prison.

Legal issues
In 2018, federal and state tax liens were filed against Brown for over $60,000 in unpaid taxes between 2012 and 2016, which Brown failed to report on his required financial disclosures during his initial primary election. He had a previous lien for over $4,000 in unpaid state taxes from 2010 to 2013.

In May 2021, Brown was arrested on misdemeanor charges for domestic violence after allegedly punching a woman at a restaurant in Talleyville, Delaware during an argument about a social media post. He was removed as chair of the Senate Judiciary Committee by Senate President Pro Tempore David Sokola several days after the arrest. After his arrest, the Women's Defense Coalition of Delaware called on the Ethics Committee of the State Senate to conduct a formal inquiry into the incident.  At trial, Brown was acquitted of all charges.

References

External links
Official page at the Delaware General Assembly
Campaign site
 

Living people
Year of birth missing (living people)
Delaware city council members
Democratic Party Delaware state senators
African-American state legislators in Delaware
21st-century American politicians
21st-century African-American politicians